Nepal Airlines Flight 183 was a scheduled domestic passenger flight operated by a DHC-6 Twin Otter that on 16 February 2014 crashed into a hill near Dhikura, Nepal.

Accident

The aircraft departed from Pokhara Airport in central Nepal with fifteen passengers and three crew members on board and was scheduled to arrive at Jumla Airport in the northwest of the country at 13:45 Nepal Standard Time (8:00 UTC). Thirty minutes into the flight, the 19-seat Twin Otter was attempting to divert to Bhairahawa Airport because of the weather conditions, resulting in radio contact being lost. The last radio communication with the aircraft crew was at 13:13, when the crew reported their approximate position to Bhairahawa Tower, in Khidim. The aircraft eventually crashed in the jungle of Masine Lek, which is located in Dhikura.

Although the crash itself was not witnessed, some residents saw remains of the crashed aircraft. At first, no one was able to get to the crash site due to poor visibility. When the rescue and recovery teams eventually reached the crash site, they found the bodies of all eighteen on board spread over the hill.

Aircraft
The aircraft, a DHC-6 Twin Otter (Registration: 9N-ABB), which was delivered to Nepal Airlines in 1971, was involved in two incidents before: On 10 June 1973 on a flight from Biratnagar to Kathmandu, the aircraft was taken over by three hijackers of Nepali Congress party who demanded money and escaped after landing in Bihar, India. None of the three crew and 18 passengers were injured.
On 5 July 1992, the aircraft lost directional control on takeoff from Jumla on a flight to Surkhet. The aircraft ran off the runway and struck the airport perimeter fence. None of the three crew were injured and there were no passengers on board.

Passengers and crew
According to Civil Aviation Authority of Nepal official Ram Hari Sharma, everybody on board, except for one Danish passenger, was Nepalese, including a child.

Investigation
The Nepalese Government formed a four-man probe team to investigate the crash. The aircraft's flight recorder was taken from the site. The investigation team was expected to report its findings within two months of the crash.

The final report of the investigation was released on 25 August 2014. It found the accident was caused by a lack of crew coordination; a lack of situational awareness on the part of the crew; and the poor weather.

References

External links
 

Aviation accidents and incidents in 2014
Aviation accidents and incidents in Nepal
Accidents and incidents involving the de Havilland Canada DHC-6 Twin Otter
2014 in Nepal
Nepal Airlines accidents and incidents
2014 disasters in Nepal